Pseudoseptis was a genus of moths that belongs to the family Noctuidae, it is now considered a synonym of Dichagyris.

Former species
 Pseudoseptis grandipennis (Grote, 1883)

References
Natural History Museum Lepidoptera genus database
Pseudoseptis at funet

Noctuinae
Obsolete arthropod taxa